Nicky Hambleton-Jones (born February 24, 1971) is a television presenter, best known for hosting the Channel 4 makeover show, 10 Years Younger. She is also an entrepreneur, stylist and anti-ageing expert.

Biography
Born in South Africa, she earned an honours degree in dietetics before starting her own private practice in Cape Town. She then took a postgraduate business course at Wits Business School, before moving to London in 1996, where she worked as a marketing consultant in the city. After being made redundant in 2001 she founded the personal stylist consultancy NHJ Style. In 2003 Nicky began presenting 10 Years Younger on Channel 4. During that time Nicky worked as a brand ambassador for a number of retail brands. In 2008 she set up the NHJ Style Academy, providing training and development for aspiring personal stylists and for retailers with personal shopping departments. Hambleton-Jones lives in London with her husband Robert and has 2 children.

Television career
In 2003, she was contacted by C4, who had seen her website and were interested in screen testing her for a new makeover show called 10 Years Younger. She was later hired and presented the program for 5 years.

Bibliography
Hambleton-Jones has published four books, one on fashion and beauty, one on nutrition, and one on making over your entire life. She also regularly styles magazine photoshoots and has various endorsement deals.
 Top to Toe: The Ultimate Guide to Becoming Who You Want to Be
"10 Years Younger" in 10 Days
"10 Years Younger" Nutrition Bible
 How To Look Gorgeous

References

External links

10 Years Younger Channel 4 website

 South African people of British descent
 Living people
1971 births
 South African television presenters